And I Love You So is a 2009 Philippine romantic drama film produced by Star Cinema, starring Bea Alonzo, Sam Milby and Derek Ramsay.  This film reunites Alonzo and Milby who previous starred together in Close to You (2006).  The film is directed by Laurenti Dyogi, and celebrates the 16th year of Star Cinema.  The film describes the feeling of forbidden love for another person when that love may not be forbidden at all.

The film was well received by critics and was nominated for different film and entertainment awards.

Plot
Lara (Bea Alonzo) meets the love of her life, Oliver Cruz (Derek Ramsay).  They live a happy married life.  She falls in love with Oliver all over again each and every day because of his charm, and also because he was her first love ever.  Yet, five months later, Oliver dies of an aneurysm, and financial problems occur for Lara, not to mention heartbreak.  At the suggestion of her friends, she rents out the former condominium she and Oliver lived in to a man named Chris Panlilio (Sam Milby), and then decides to live with her mother-in-law, Kate, and sister-in-law, Audrey.  Intent to help his landlady learn to move on with her life, Chris decides to guide Lara into doing different daily activities to be happy again, in exchange for her teaching him proper Tagalog.  Yet, this newfound friendship turns into something more special,

Cast

 Bea Alonzo as Lara Cruz
 Sam Milby as Chris Panlilio
 Derek Ramsay as Oliver Cruz
 Coney Reyes as Kate Cruz
 Nikki Gil as Audrey Cruz
 Candy Pangilinan as Teacher Paula
 Maricar Reyes as Rachel
 Cacai Bautista as Teacher Lani
 Dick Israel as Jun Panlilio
 Angel Jacob as Jane
 RJ Ledesma as Mike Panlilio
 Janna Dominguez as Teacher Teresa
 Cai Cortez as Teacher Grace
 Gilette Sandico as Margie
 Isabel Rivas as Melanie
 Niña Dolino as Sexy Girl 1
 Kristel Moreno as Sexy Girl 3

Reception
And I Love You So earned second place in the Philippines during its opening weekend (August 12, 2009 - August 16, 2009) after G.I. Joe: The Rise of Cobra.  The film earned  (or ) in revenue.  During its second week, the film stayed in the Top 5 films of that weekend holding spot Number 3 behind Disney's Up and G.I. Joe: The Rise of Cobra, respectively.  It earned . As of its first two weeks in Philippine theatres, it garnered a gross revenue of  As of January 2010, the film has grossed  in revenue.
The film received generally favorable reviews.

Production
And I Love You So was the first Star Cinema-produced film not to be shown in any theater operated by SM City Chain, the largest in the Philippines. ABS-CBN canceled releasing the film after a negotiation over profit sharing between the two companies bogged down.

"And I Love You So" was a popular song by Don McLean and Perry Como. The song was covered by Gary Valenciano for the film. A version by Sam Milby was also used in the film.

Full Cast & Crew
Starring: Bea Alonzo, Derek Ramsay, & Sam Milby Together With Coney Reyes, Cai Cortez, Maricar Reyes, Nikki Gil, Candy Pangilinan, Kristel Moreno, Niña Dolino, Cacai Bautista, Dick Israel, Gilette Sandico, Angel Jacob, Isabel Rivas, & Janna Dominguez
Directed by: Laurenti Dyogi
Produced by: Kara Kintanar, Elma S. Medua, Charo Santos-Concio & Malou Santos
Music by: Carmina Cuya
Film Edited by: Marya Ignacio 
Production Designed by: Nancy Arcega (as Nancy M. Arcega)
Story & Screenplay by: Vanessa R. Valdez & Jacqueline Franquelli (as Jacqueline V. Franquelli)
Sound by: April Castro (dubbing supervisor), Noel Urbano (dubbing supervisor)
Camera & Electrical Department: Jun Agravante (still photographer) (as Ely Agravante), Raul Agravante (still photographer), Joel Casaul (car mount/tents - as Joel Casaol), Nonito Cesario (second assistant camera)

See also
 List of Philippine films of the 2000s

References

External links
 

2009 films
2000s Tagalog-language films
2009 romantic drama films
Star Cinema films
Philippine romantic drama films